Martinex T'Naga is a character appearing in American comic books published by Marvel Comics. The character is depicted as being from an alternate future in the 31st century, and member of the Guardians of the Galaxy.

His first appearance was in Marvel Super-Heroes #18, published January 1969.

Michael Rosenbaum played Martinex in the Marvel Cinematic Universe film Guardians of the Galaxy Vol. 2 (2017) and will reprise his role in Guardians of the Galaxy Vol. 3 (2023).

Publication history
Martinex first appeared in Marvel Super-Heroes #18 (Jan. 1969) as part of the Guardians of the Galaxy. According to Roy Thomas, all of the original Guardians of the Galaxy were created in a conference between Arnold Drake and Stan Lee, but it remains uncertain whether each individual character was created by Drake, Lee, or both. The team was featured in several Marvel titles: Marvel Two-In-One #4-5 (July-Sept. 1974), Giant Size Defenders #5, and The Defenders #26-29 (July-Nov. 1975), and writer Steve Gerber included the character when he revived the team in Marvel Presents #3-#12 (Feb. 1976-Aug. 1977).

Martinex's appearance was redesigned in Guardians of the Galaxy #7 (Dec. 1990). Writer/artist Jim Valentino commented, "No one could draw [Martinex] the same way twice. It was impossible and it was a pain in the butt. What I did was streamline him according to the planes in the body that Andrew Loomis delineated in his seminal book, Figure Drawing for All It's Worth."

Maxrtine appeared along with the rest of the original Guardians of the Galaxy team in the 2014 series Guardians 3000.  Writer Dan Abnett described him as "the brain" of the team.

Fictional character biography
In their future, Earth had colonized several planets in its Solar System, including Pluto. Martinex was born on Cerberus Center, Pluto, although it was later revealed his ancestors were from the continent of Africa on Earth.

He grew up to become a scientist and technician. Like the other Pluvians, Martinex's body was completely covered by facets that were crystalline in appearance. This design was so that the Pluvians could withstand the extreme temperatures of their world. Martinex could also emit heat and cold from his hands. Martinex became the last surviving Plutonian after the Badoon exterminated all the other Plutonians, as he was working on Pluto's moon Charon. The Pluvians had been forewarned of the attack, but the ship they were escaping on was destroyed by the Badoon. Martinex escaped the Badoon using a telepod and teamed with Vance Astro, a human astronaut from the 20th century with psychic powers, Charlie-27, a Jovian who was the last of his race as well, and Yondu, from Alpha Centauri, to fight the Badoon as the freedom fighters, the Guardians of the Galaxy. It was later revealed Starhawk had manipulated events to bring them together.

The Guardians later teamed with the time-traveling Thing, Captain America, and Sharon Carter to retake New York City from Badoon forces. Martinex and the Guardians then time-traveled to the 20th Century and met the Defenders. They returned to the future with Starhawk and the Defenders and defeated the Badoon.

Eventually, the Guardians drove the Badoon from Earth's solar system and Martinex later became the team's reluctant leader for a time. The Guardians departed post-war Earth on a space mission, and met Nikki who joined the Guardians of the Galaxy, and they visited the Asylum planet. The Guardians then teamed with a time-traveling Thor, and battled Korvac and his Minions of Menace. Martinex and the Guardians traveled to the present era, and assisted the Avengers in battle against Korvac. He attended an Avengers membership meeting but left soon afterwards.

While looking for the shield of Captain America, the Guardians came into conflict with Taserface and the Stark. They also encountered Firelord and defeated the Stark. The Guardians then battled a team of superhumans known as Force, and Martinex was mortally injured by the member of Force known as Brawl. Much of the crystals that covered Martinex's body were shattered, but Martinex recovered with the help of fellow Guardian Starhawk. All of the exterior crystals on Martinex fell away, leaving Martinex with a new crystalline appearance, one that was less faceted, and somewhat purple in tone. The Guardians then located Haven, a lost colony of Earth founded by mutants, where they battled Rancor and her lieutenants. Martinex later met the Spirit of Vengeance.

Eventually, Martinex left the team to form a larger version of the Guardians, known as the Galactic Guardians. This team was summoned to help rescue an imperiled planet full of innocents. The Galactic Guardians were initially made up of alternate future versions of Wonder Man, Firelord, the Vision, Phoenix, and Ghost Rider. They had further adventures in their own limited series. Martinex later returns to the Guardians of the Galaxy.

Powers and abilities
Martinex is a member of the genetically engineered human colonists whose traits were designed for survival under these cold conditions from the dwarf planet Pluto. He possesses enhanced strength, stamina, and durability. His epidermis is also composed of an organic silicon crystal. Martinex has the ability to convert bodily energy into laser-like beams, which he can project from his hands, either heat stimulation (right hand) or coldness (left hand). He could even withstand all conventional forms of injury. Martinex must rest and replenish his powers after using them at maximum output for a half-hour.

Martinex possesses expertise in various areas of the 31st century technology, including physics and engineering.

In other media
 Martinex appears in the live-action film Guardians of the Galaxy Vol. 2, portrayed by Michael Rosenbaum. This version is a member of Stakar Ogord's faction of Ravagers. Martinex visits Yondu Udonta on the planet Contraxia along with his leader to remind Yondu that he is in exile for breaking the Ravagers' code. After learning Yondu sacrificed himself to save Peter Quill, Martinex and Stakar are moved by the former's selflessness and attend his funeral. The two of them later decide to bring the rest of their team back together to honor him.

References

Comics characters introduced in 1969
Fictional characters with fire or heat abilities
Fictional characters with ice or cold abilities
Fictional characters with superhuman durability or invulnerability
Fictional genetically engineered characters
Fictional engineers
Fictional physicists
Guardians of the Galaxy characters
Marvel Comics aliens
Marvel Comics characters with superhuman strength
Marvel Comics scientists
Marvel Comics superheroes